Sabino Azurin Vengco, Jr., H.P. (March 9, 1942 – May 17, 2021) was a Filipino priest, theologian, and author.

Biography
Vengco was born on March 9, 1942, in Hagonoy, Bulacan, Philippines.

He completed his priestly studies at the San Carlos Seminary in 1965; he was ordained the next year.

He has served at the theology department of the San Carlos Seminary as lecturer, department head and dean. He also taught at the Loyola School of Studies at the Ateneo de Manila University, the Immaculate Conception Seminary of the Diocese of Malolos, the UST School of Ecclesiastical Studies and at the Recoletos School of Theology.

He has published a number of books on theology and Mariology. He also wrote for various newspapers such as the Manila Times and the Business Mirror.

He founded the Kadiwa sa Pagkapari Foundation Inc., which aims to provide foster care for retired priests.

He died on May 17, 2021, at the Cardinal Santos Medical Center, of unspecified reasons.

Awards
Source:

 Outstanding Catholic Author (1989) - Ateneo de Manila University
 Bukas Palad award (2003) - Ateneo de Manila University
 "Serviam" award (2006) - Catholic Mass Media Awards
 San Jose Award (Outstanding Alumnus) (2009) - San Jose Seminary
 Gawad Sagisag Quezon (2009) - Komisyon ng Wikang Filipino
 Dangal ng Lipi (Panglilingkod sa Pampamayanan) (2010) - Bulacan provincial government

References

1942 births
2021 deaths
People from Bulacan
Filipino Roman Catholic theologians
21st-century Filipino Roman Catholic priests
20th-century Filipino Roman Catholic priests